Baltic Robinson: 2001, was the second version of Expedition Robinson, or Survivor to air in the Baltic region of Europe. This season premiered on 6 October 2001 and aired until December 15, 2001. Like in the first season, the three tribes were divided based on the contestants country of origin. Along with this, each tribe was given the name of the country of its contestants origin in that country's native language. For an unknown reason there were only twelve contestants when this season started as opposed to the usual fifteen. When it came time for the merge a joker, Siiri Kuusmann from Estonia, entered the competition. As another twist, at the fifth tribal council two players were eliminated instead of the usual one. Due to the medical emergency that saw Vidmantas Lietuvninkas evacuation from the game, Linas Samaška from Lithuania became the first finalist of the season in episode eight. By the end of the same episode, Māris Sveiduks also became a finalist when the only other contestant from Latvia that remained, Anna Steina, was voted out at tribal council. As Māris won the final immunity challenge in episode nine, he and he alone would vote to determine who of Siiri Kuusmann and Viive Rižski would be the finalist from Estonia and the final contestant through to the final. When it came time for the final a combination of votes cast by jurors, votes cast by the public, and penalty votes from plank decided the winner. Ultimately, Māris Sveiduks of Latvia who won the season with just 2 votes against him, the runner up was Estonian Siiri Kuusmann with 13 votes against her and the second runner up was Lithuanian Linas Samaška with 19 votes against him.

On April 15, 2011 Estonian representative Urmas Heinmaa died in his sleep. At the time of his death Heinmaa was 48.

Finishing order

Voting history

As Siiri was new in episode six, she was not permitted to vote or be voted for at the fifth tribal council.

As Linas and Siiri both lost plank, they each had additional votes against them at the final tribal council. The public of each country was also voting to give additional votes to two of the three finalists. The finalist who placed first in the polls in each country would receive four votes against them, the person who placed second would receive two votes against them, and the person who placed third would receive no additional votes.

References

External links
Official Site Archive

Baltic
Latvian television shows
Lithuanian television shows
Estonian television shows
2000s Estonian television series
2000s Latvian television series
2000s Lithuanian television series
Estonian reality television series
Latvian reality television series
Lithuanian reality television series
2000s reality television series
2001 Estonian television seasons
2001 Latvian television seasons
2001 Lithuanian television seasons